William "Billy" Pye is an American ice hockey coach and former goaltender who was an All-American for Northern Michigan and helped the team win its first National Championship in 1991.

Career
Pye arrived in Marquette in the fall of 1987 and served as a backup to Mike Jeffrey in his freshman season. He took over the starting role at the start of his sophomore season and provided an immediate boost in goal. NMU went from 6th to 2nd in the WCHA and Pye led the Wilcats to their first WCHA Championship, capturing MVP honors. Northern Michigan wasn't able to make it out of the First Round of the NCAA Tournament but the Buffalo Sabres had seen enough to select Pye in the 6th round of NHL Draft.

Pye had a rocky year as a junior, seeing his goals against average swell by more than a goal per game. The team managed a middling season and lost two overtime games in the conference tournament to finish in 4th place. In Pye's senior season, however, everything turned up roses. Northern Michigan won its first WCHA regular season title and Pye finished in the top 10 in the nation. He led the country with 32 wins and was named an All-American. In the postseason he shut down some of the strongest offenses in the country, enabling NMU to win their second WCHA title and became the only player to earn two WCHA tournament MVP's. Northern Michigan received a bye into the quarterfinal round of the NCAA Tournament and Pye proved solid in net while the offense ran over their opponents. NMU made its second championship appearance that year and the final game turned out to be one for the ages. Pye allowed three goals in the first but became a bulwark in the middle frame while the Wildcats scored five goals to take a commanding lead. Boston University, peppered with future NHL stars like Tony Amonte and Shawn McEachern, roared back with a 4-goal third and the two teams ended regulation with a 7–7 tie. The match became just the second championship game in history to need multiple overtime sessions and ended when Darryl Plandowski got the Wildcats the win in the third 10-minute extra frame.

After graduating, Pye began his professional career in the Sabres' minor league system. The closest Pye got to playing in the NHL was as an emergency call-up on two occasions. In November 1992, Dominik Hasek was suffering from a groin injury and Pye sat on the bench in game against the Ottawa Senators. He was replaced the following day by Clint Malarchuk. Almost two months later both Darren Puppa and Dominik Hasek were injured and Pye was recalled to serve as a backup for Tom Draper. He remained with the Sabres for a week but didn't play in any of the games. Pye was never able to find his form in the pro game and was progressively demoted until landing in the WPHL in the mid-90's. Pye had three 20-win seasons over a 4-year span and decided to call it quits in 2000. Upon his retirement as a player, Pye founded the "Billy Pye Goaltending Academy" and continued to operate the business in the Dallas–Fort Worth area.

While operating his business, Pye served as the goaltending coach for a few local junior teams, including the Wichita Falls Wildcats. He was inducted into the Northern Michigan Athletic Hall of Fame in 2007.

Statistics

Regular season and playoffs

Awards and honors

References

External links

Billy Pye Goaltending Academy 

1969 births
Living people
AHCA Division I men's ice hockey All-Americans
American men's ice hockey goaltenders
Ice hockey players from Michigan
People from Canton, Michigan
Northern Michigan Wildcats men's ice hockey players
Erie Panthers players
Fort Wayne Komets players
New Haven Nighthawks players
Rochester Americans players
South Carolina Stingrays players
Saginaw Wheels players
Columbus Chill players
Waco Wizards players
Odessa Jackalopes players
Fort Worth Brahmas players
Buffalo Sabres draft picks
NCAA men's ice hockey national champions